Guben (Polish and Sorbian: Gubin) is a town on the Lusatian Neisse river in Lower Lusatia, in the state of Brandenburg, Germany. Located in the Spree-Neiße district, Guben has a population of 20,049. Along with Frankfurt (Oder) and Görlitz, Guben is a divided city on the border between Germany and Poland, having been separated into Guben and Gubin in 1945 by the Oder–Neisse line.

Geography

Environment 
Guben is located in the district (Landkreis) of Spree-Neiße in the southeast of the state of Brandenburg. It is in the historical region of Lower Lusatia. Guben's position on the banks of the Lusatian Neisse between two plateaus was advantageous in its early economic development. These plateaus developed from ground moraines of the Wisconsin glaciation period. Both the western (Kaltenborner Berge = Kaltenborn Hills) and eastern (Gubener Berge = Guben Hills) ended up as terminal moraines. The surrounding land is covered with pine forests and lakes.

Districts 
Guben is divided into the unofficial sections of:
Altstadt, formerly to 1945 Klostervorstadt (developed from the early Benedictine cloister area, which developed into the industrial suburb of pre-division Guben)
Sprucke (originally Vorwerk Altsprucke, added after 1920 with quarter Neusprucke and after 1963 with quarter Obersprucke)
Reichenbach

Guben is divided into the official districts (with district mayors) of:
Bresinchen
Deulowitz
Groß Breesen (with Grunewald)
Kaltenborn
Schlagsdorf

Coat of arms 
The coat of arms of Guben depicts a red wall with three gates (Klostertor, Crossener Tor, Werdertor) and three towers. The three inescutcheons depict the arms of the historic rulers: the Kings of Prussia, the Kings of Bohemia, and the Electors of Saxony. The coat of arms of the Polish sister city Gubin features a Piast Eagle inescutcheon instead.

History

Medieval Guben 
Guben began to develop around 1200 as a trade and marketplace on the roads between Leipzig and Poznań and between Görlitz and Frankfurt (Oder). A settlement on the eastern shore of the Lusatian Neisse was protected by swamps to the south and by the Lubst, a tributary of the Neisse, to the north and the east. Henry III, Margrave of Meissen, granted this settlement Magdeburg rights on June 1, 1235, and declared it an oppidum (town). On the western shore of the river, a cloister of Benedictine nuns began developing as an outlying suburb of the town on the eastern shore of the river. In a charter of 1312 Guben received its coat of arms displaying three towers.

Until 1815, Guben belonged uninterruptedly to the Margravate of Lower Lusatia. Between 1367 and 1635 the margravate belonged to the crown of Bohemia. The city was fortified in the 14th century with earthworks, trenches, and wooden planking, and then refortified from 1523 to 1544. In 1635 Elector John George I of Saxony received Lower Lusatia and Guben in the Peace of Prague.

Growth of economy and infrastructure 
Guben's textile industry began to develop in the 16th century, although it began to flourish in the 19th century, especially with leather gloves in 1849. Beginning in 1822, Guben's production of hats covered 65% of German demand. Later industrialization led to the production of rugs and shoes. Lignite processing began in the eastern half of the city in 1847. The tradition for weaving is still prevalent in modern times as the textile company Trevira maintains a manufacturing plant in the city.

Guben station was opened with the railway between Frankfurt (Oder) and Breslau (Wrocław) in 1846 and the Cottbus–Guben railway was opened in 1871. A direct line to Forst (Lausitz) was finished in 1904, and a tram line ran in the city from February 24, 1904, until June 8, 1938.

In 1815 the Margravate of Lower Lusatia was abolished and replaced with the district system. Guben became the capital of a district within the Province of Brandenburg. On April 1, 1884, the city of Guben separated from the district of Guben and became its own urban district. On December 1, 1928, the region of Mückenberg was incorporated from the district of Guben into the city of Guben.

Most recently the Anatomist Doctor Gunther von Hagens, from Heidelberg University where he developed many of his cadaver plastinating techniques, has purchased a disused woolens manufacturing factory. This has been  renovated and converted into a museum-cum-work centre. He expects to employ approximately 200 people, which will have some impact on the local unemployment figures currently running at close to 20%

There have been some objections to this development on moral grounds, but the majority of the Guben's population see this development as a good thing for the future prosperity of Guben.

After World War II 

At the Potsdam Conference at the end of World War II in 1945, the boundary between Germany and Poland was fixed as the Oder–Neisse line. Because Guben was on the Lusatian Neisse, the city was separated into German Guben and the eastern part annexed by Poland to become the Polish town Gubin.

Because the historical center of Guben became Gubin, the western suburbs which grew from the Benedictine cloister remained in Guben. Although underdeveloped compared to the town across the river, the remaining Guben began to grow extensively after 1945, especially through the construction of a chemical plant and additional residential areas. From 1952 to 1990, Guben was part of the Bezirk Cottbus of East Germany. From 1961 to 1990 Guben was officially named "Wilhelm-Pieck-Stadt Guben" by East Germany after its first and only State President Wilhelm Pieck, who was born in the eastern half of the city (today's Gubin) in 1876. From June 1950 until July 23, 1952, Guben was part of the district of Cottbus.

Reunification 
The German reunification in 1990 brought economic depression and unemployment to the city. When the district of Guben was abolished on December 6, 1993, Guben became part of the district of Spree-Neiße. In recent years the city has begun developing closer ties with Gubin across the river.

Demography 
The following is an overview of Guben's population. Until 1844 the population was mostly estimated, while afterwards the figures are from census results.

Notable people

 Johann Crüger (1598–1662), hymns composer, cantor in Berlin (St. Nicolai)
 Johann Franck (1618–1677), lawyer, mayor of Guben, hymns poet
 Corona Schröter (1751–1802), musician and singer who was a close confidant of Johann von Goethe
 Ludwig von Falkenhausen (1844–1936), Colonel General, 1917–1918 Governor General in Belgium
 Alexander Tschirch (1856–1939), a pharmacologist in Bern, Switzerland
 Ludwig von Reuter (1869–1943), Admiral of the Imperial Navy, commanded 1919. sinking in Scapa Flow
 Wilhelm Pieck (1876–1960), politician (KPD, SED) member of the Reichstag, President of the GDR
 Heinrich Gaedcke (1905–1992), officer in the Reichswehr, Wehrmacht and Bundeswehr
 Gerhard Pohl (1937–2012), engineer, politician and Minister of Economy of the GDR
 Barbara Dittus (1939–2001), actress
 Danilo Hondo (born 1974), cyclist, German Champion 2002
 Ska Keller (born 1981), politician (The Greens), Member of European Parliament

Twin towns
Guben is twinning with the following towns:
 Cittadella, Italy
 Gubin, Poland
 Laatzen, Germany

References

External links 
All links are in German.

 Official website of Guben
 City economic site
 Tourist information
 History from 1871–1945
 Site of a local publisher with historical information

Populated places in Spree-Neiße
Divided cities
Germany–Poland border crossings